Oana Andreea Lefter (née: Manea; born 18 April 1985) is a former handball. She  retired from the Romania national team in 2016. Her father, Dumitru Manea was a football player.

She was given the award of Cetățean de onoare ("Honorary Citizen") of the city of Bucharest in 2016.

International honours
EHF Champions League:
Winner: 2016
Silver Medalist: 2010
Bronze Medalist: 2017, 2018
EHF Champions Trophy:
Winner: 2007
EHF Cup Winners' Cup:
Winner: 2007
Finalist: 2002
IHF World Championship:
Bronze Medalist: 2015
European Championship:
Bronze Medalist: 2010
GF World Cup:
Gold Medalist: 2009, 2010 
World University Championship:
Bronze Medalist: 2008
European Youth Championship:
Silver Medalist: 2003

Individual awards
 Romanian Handballer of the Year: 2011
 Carpathian Trophy Most Valuable Player: 2012
 Prosport All-Star Line Player of the Romanian Liga Națională: 2017, 2018

References

 

1985 births
Living people
Sportspeople from Bucharest
Romanian female handball players
SCM Râmnicu Vâlcea (handball) players
Expatriate handball players
Romanian expatriate sportspeople in Slovenia
Handball players at the 2016 Summer Olympics
Olympic handball players of Romania